Taiwanese Canadian Association of Toronto (TCAT), the largest general-purpose all-ages Taiwanese organization in the Greater Toronto Area, was established back in 1963 and later registered as a non-profit organization in the Province of Ontario in 1975.

The stated objectives of TCAT are: to promote the common interest and welfare of the members, to provide cultural and recreational activities for the Taiwanese community, and to better the inter-group relations within the context of Canadian multiculturalism.

TCAT hosts cultural, social, and sport events throughout the year and also publishes three issues of TOGETHER magazines each year.

Two divisions, namely the Formosan Cup Division (tFCD) and the Public Affair Division (tPAD), were established in 1974 and 2009 respectively to focus on special events that promotes multiculturalism.

Missions
 To assist with Taiwanese immigrants, who reside in the GTA, in adapting to the environment of Canada.
 To gather members to serve local communities within the GTA.
 To provide methods of communications between members and all three levels of Canadian governments.
 To maintain and promote Taiwanese culture to the Canadian society.

History
TCAT was founded in the spring of 1963. Professor Assistant, Yi-Ming Huang, and two post graduate students at the University of Waterloo invited about 20 Taiwanese overseas students from Ontario and Quebec to Niagara Falls for a day trip. After dinner, one student suggested to establish an association with a mission to strengthen communication and supports among overseas students from Taiwan. In a unanimous decision, Dr. Yi-Ming Huang and Dr. Chien-Si Cheng were elected as the President and Vice President, respectively.

A year later, TCAT had tremendous increase in memberships and Professor Jui-Yang Lin was elected as the President at the inaugural meeting in Cornwall. TCAT was registered as a non-profit corporation on October 22, 1975. Members in the early days had been devoting their time, effort, and money to Taiwanese democratic activities. Since then, the association has evolved and adapted to increasing immigrants; its events and activities become more diversified.

Structure
 Members
 Board of Directors (BoD)
 President
 Vice-Presidents
 Secretary
 Treasurers
 Directors
 Advisors
 Auditors
 Divisions
 Formosan Cup Division (tFCD)
 Public Affair Division (tPAD)

Membership

All TCAT members meet the following membership criteria:
 Be 18 years of age or older, or with permissions of legal guardians for those under the age of 18
 Agree with all missions of TCAT

Regular Member
 Must meet all membership criteria
 Must reside near the Greater Toronto Area
 The member, his/her spouse or one of the parents was born in Taiwan

Regular members have the right to vote, be elected, recall and resolve.

Supporting Member
 Meets all membership criteria
 Does not meet the requirements of Regular Member
 Must be nominated by two Regular Members
 Must be approved by the BoD

Supporting Members have all the membership privileges except for the following: rights to vote, to be elected, to recall, and to resolve.

Honorary Member
 Meets all membership criteria
 Has made outstanding contributions to the Taiwanese Canadian community or TCAT, or made one time significant donation
 Must be nominated and approved by the BoD

Honorary Members do not need to pay for membership dues, and have all the membership privileges except for the following: rights to vote, to be elected, to recall, and to resolve.

Divisions

Formosan Cup Division
The Formosan Cup Division (tFCD) of TCAT hosts a softball tournament that has been widely regarded as one of the premier Asian softball events in all of North America.

Public Affair Division
The Public Affair Division (tPAD) of TCAT seeks to work selflessly in recruiting members under the TCAT umbrella, with a focus on relatively younger members who are extremely proficient in English or French and have a strong desire for making a difference within our community. In addition, tPAD will strive to make a valiant attempt to slowly build a greater presence for the Taiwanese Canadians in our newly adopted country.

Events

Annual Events
 Spring
 Taiwan Heritage Week/Day
 Parents' Day Celebration
 Summer
 Summer Joint BBQ
 Autumn
 Mid-Autumn Festival
 Winter
 Annual General Meeting
 Lunar New Year Festival

Regular Events
 TCAT Sportacular
 Bi-monthly/Monthly sports events that involve basketball and badminton games.

Special Events
 Aug 2010
 Yen-Hsun Lu at Rogers Cup on Aug 10, 2010
 Feb 2012
 NBA Jeremy Lin vs Toronto Raptors Part I on Feb 14, 2012
 Mar 2012
 TCAT 2012 Basketball Night on Mar 15, 2012
 NBA Jeremy Lin vs Toronto Raptors Part II on Mar 23, 2012

TOGETHER Magazine

Available for TCAT members only in either printed or electronics format.

Targeted publishing dates for each year:
 Apr 15
 Aug 15
 Dec 15

Affiliations
 World
 World Federation of Taiwanese Associations (WFTA)
 Canada
 Taiwanese Canadian Association (TCA)
 Ontario
 Canadian Multicultural Council - Asians in Ontario (CMC-AO)
 Toronto
 Association of Taiwanese Organizations in Toronto (ATOT)
 Taiwanese Canadian Toronto Credit Union (TCTCU)
 Formosa Evergreen Senior Citizens Centre (FESCC)

See also
 Taiwan
 Canada
 Toronto
 Taiwanese Canadian

References

External links
 Official Website
 Official TCAT Presidents Timeline
 Official Facebook Group
 Formosan Cup Website

Non-profit organizations based in Toronto
Ethnic organizations based in Canada
Canada–Taiwan relations
Taiwanese Canadian